is the thirteenth single of J-pop idol group Morning Musume and was released October 31, 2001.

Overview
It sold a total of 513,340 copies and reached number one on the Oricon Charts. This single also marked the debut of the fifth generation members Ai Takahashi, Risa Niigaki, Makoto Ogawa, and Asami Konno. The song exhibits heavy swing-style music influence, and the video featured the group dressed in outfits reminiscent of swing's peak era. Lead vocals are Hitomi Yoshizawa, Maki Goto, and Natsumi Abe.

Inspiration for the cross-dressing costumes, theatrical style, and trademark staircase dancing appears to have been taken from Japan's Takarazuka Revue, an all-female musical theater troupe famous for its gender-bending performances.

Legacy
In 2002, an English-language cover ("Mr. Moonlight") was recorded by Elisa Fiorillo for the album Cover Morning Musume Hello! Project!.

Track listing 
All lyrics and composition by Tsunku.
 
 
 "Mr. Moonlight (Ai no Big Band)" (Instrumental)

Members at the time of single 
1st generation: Kaori Iida, Natsumi Abe
2nd generation: Kei Yasuda, Mari Yaguchi 
3rd generation: Maki Goto
4th generation: Rika Ishikawa, Hitomi Yoshizawa, Nozomi Tsuji, Ai Kago
5th generation : Ai Takahashi, Asami Konno, Makoto Ogawa, Risa Niigaki

References

External links 
 Mr. Moonlight (Ai no Big Band) entry at Up-Front Works Official Website

Morning Musume songs
Zetima Records singles
2001 singles
Oricon Weekly number-one singles
Songs written by Tsunku
Song recordings produced by Tsunku
Japanese-language songs
2001 songs